Richard Mervin Bissell Jr. (September 18, 1909 – February 7, 1994) was an American Central Intelligence Agency officer responsible for major projects such as the U-2 spy plane and the Bay of Pigs Invasion. He is seen as one of the most important spymasters in CIA history.

Early years
Richard Mervin Bissell Jr. was the son of Richard Bissell, the president of Hartford Fire Insurance. He was born in the Mark Twain House in Hartford, Connecticut, and went to Groton School in Groton, Massachusetts. Two of his fellow pupils at Groton were Joseph Alsop and Tracy Barnes. He studied history at Yale University, turning down membership in Skull and Bones, and graduating in 1932, then studied at the London School of Economics. He returned to Yale where he obtained a Ph.D. in economics in 1939. His brother, William, also attended Yale and became a member of Skull and Bones.

Marshall Plan
In July 1947, Bissell was recruited by W. Averell Harriman to run a committee to lobby for an economic recovery plan for Europe. The following year he was appointed as an administrator of the Marshall Plan in Germany and eventually became head of the Economic Cooperation Administration (ECA). Bissell worked with the Office of Policy Coordination (OPC) in diverting counterpart funds of the ECA to OPC operations in Europe.

Georgetown Set

Bissell moved to Washington, D.C., where he associated with a group of journalists, politicians, and government officials that became known as the Georgetown Set. Originally formed in 1945–1948 by Frank Wisner, Stewart Alsop, Thomas Braden, Philip Graham, David K. E. Bruce and Walt Rostow—a group of former Office of Strategic Services veterans from World War Two—the grouping would expand its informal membership around the Georgetown section of Washington, D.C. The group would grow to include Ben Bradlee, George Kennan, Dean Acheson, Desmond FitzGerald, Joseph Alsop, Tracy Barnes, James Truitt, Clark Clifford, Eugene Rostow, Charles "Chip" Bohlen, Cord Meyer, James Angleton, William Averell Harriman, John McCloy, Felix Frankfurter, John Sherman Cooper, James Reston, Allen W. Dulles, and Paul Nitze.

Many wives accompanied their husbands to these gatherings. Members of what was later called the Georgetown Ladies' Social Club included Katharine Meyer Graham, Mary Pinchot Meyer, Antoinette Pinchot, Anne Truitt, Sally Reston, Polly Wisner, Joan Braden, Lorraine Cooper, Evangeline Bruce, Avis Bohlen, Janet Barnes, Tish Alsop, Cynthia Helms,
Marietta FitzGerald, Phyllis Nitze, and Annie Bissell.

Work with CIA
Bissell worked for the Ford Foundation for a while but Frank Wisner persuaded him to join the Central Intelligence Agency (CIA).

U-2 'spy plane'
In 1954 he was placed in charge of developing and operating the Lockheed U-2 'spy plane'. Bissell and Herbert Miller, another CIA officer, chose Area 51 in 1955 as the site for the test facility for the U-2, and Bissell supervised the test facility and its build up until he resigned from the CIA.    The U-2 spy plane was a great success and within two years Bissell was able to say that 90% of all hard intelligence about the Soviet Union coming into the CIA was "funneled through the lens of the U-2's aerial cameras". This information convinced President Dwight D. Eisenhower that Nikita Khrushchev was lying about the number of bombers and missiles being built by the Soviet Union. The photographs debunked the allegations of a "bomber gap," the belief that the Soviets had an advantage over the United States in the number of strategic bomber aircraft that could reach the other country. However, because of the great shroud of secrecy erected by the CIA around the source of the information, the U-2 spy plane program, the hysteria in some American circles based on the allegations of the bomber gap was not publicly put to rest. 

In 1956, after the Soviet Union protested the first U-2 overflights, Bissell initiated Project RAINBOW to develop radar camouflage for the aircraft.  When this was unsuccessful, he initiated GUSTO to develop a follow-on aircraft.  This evolved into Project OXCART, under which the CIA developed and operated the Lockheed A-12.

Vision for the CIA
Bissell delivered an address at the CIA entitled "The Stimulation of Innovation" in 1957 that called for funding the research and development of groundbreaking new technologies for intelligence gathering and surveillance. He acknowledged that such surveillance may entail "gray activities" by the CIA, surveillance that the CIA may not have the legal right to undertake. But he urged that the dubious legal status of such activities should not preclude the CIA from pursuing them. He also advocated that the CIA implement  covert political actions in target countries.

CIA Deputy Director for Plans
After Frank Wisner suffered a mental breakdown in September 1958, Bissell replaced him as the CIA's Deputy Director for Plans (DDP). Bissel officially assumed the office on 1 January 1959. Richard Helms stayed on as Bissell's deputy. The Directorate for Plans reportedly controlled over half the CIA's budget and was responsible for covert operations. (DDP oversaw plans to overthrow Jacobo Arbenz Guzmán, Patrice Lumumba, Rafael Leonidas Trujillo, Ngo Dinh Diem, and others.  Bissell's main target was Fidel Castro.)

As DD/P, Bissell also oversaw the early stages of Project OXCART, the development of the Lockheed A-12.

He also played a key role, as CIA Program Manager, in the development of the Corona program.

In March 1960, President Eisenhower approved a CIA plan to overthrow Castro.  (See Operation 40). The strategy was organized by Bissell. Sidney Gottlieb of the CIA Technical Services Division was asked to come up with proposals that would undermine Castro's popularity with the Cuban people. (Gottlieb also ran the MK-ULTRA project from 1953–1964.) These schemes were rejected and instead Bissell decided to arrange Castro's assassination.

In September 1960, Bissell and Allen W. Dulles, the director of the Central Intelligence Agency (CIA), initiated talks with two leading figures of the Mafia, Johnny Roselli and Sam Giancana. Later, other crime bosses such as Carlos Marcello, Santo Trafficante Jr. and Meyer Lansky became involved in this first plot against Castro. The strategy was managed by Sheffield Edwards; Robert Maheu, a veteran of CIA counter-espionage activities, was instructed to offer the Mafia $150,000 to kill Fidel Castro. The advantage of employing the Mafia for this work is that it provided CIA with a credible cover story. The Mafia were known to be angry with Castro for closing down their profitable brothels and casinos in Cuba. If the assassins were killed or captured the media would accept that the Mafia were working on their own.  The Mafia played along in order to get protection from the FBI.

Bay of Pigs Invasion plans

In March 1960 a top-secret policy paper was drafted entitled: "A Program of Covert Action Against the Castro Regime" (code-named JMARC), "to bring about the replacement of the Castro regime with one more ... acceptable to the U.S. in such a manner as to avoid any appearance of U.S. intervention." This paper was based on operation PBSuccess, the policy that had worked so well in Guatemala in 1954. In fact, Bissell assembled the same team as the one used in Guatemala:  Tracy Barnes, David Atlee Phillips, Jacob Esterline, William "Rip" Robertson, E. Howard Hunt and Gerry Droller (aka "Frank Bender").  Added to the team were Jack Hawkins (Colonel), Desmond FitzGerald, William Harvey and Ted Shackley.

President-elect John F. Kennedy was given a copy of the JMARC proposal by Bissell and Allen W. Dulles in Palm Beach, Florida on 18 November 1960. According to Bissell, Kennedy remained impassive throughout the meeting. He expressed surprise only at the scale of the operation.

In March 1961 John F. Kennedy asked the Joint Chiefs of Staff to vet the JMARC project. As a result of "plausible deniability" they were not given details of the plot to kill Castro. The JCS reported that if the invaders were given four days of air cover, if the people of Trinidad, Cuba joined the rebellion and if they were able to join up with the guerrillas in the Escambray Mountains, the overall rating of success was 30%. Therefore, they could not recommend that Kennedy go along with the JMARC project.

At a meeting on 11 March 1961, Kennedy rejected Bissell’s proposed scheme. He told him to go away and draft a new plan. He asked for it to be "less spectacular" and with a more remote landing site than Trinidad. It appears that Kennedy had completely misunderstood the report from the JCS.

Bissell now resubmitted his plan. As requested, the landing was no longer at Trinidad. Instead he selected Bahia de Cochinos (Bay of Pigs). This was 80 miles from the Escambray Mountains. What is more, this journey to the mountains was across an impenetrable swamp. As Bissell explained to Kennedy, this meant that the guerrilla fallback option had been removed from the operation.

As Allen W. Dulles recorded at the time: "We felt that when the chips were down, when the crisis arose in reality, any action required for success would be authorized rather than permit the enterprise to fail." In other words, he realized that the initial invasion was likely to fail, but believed that Kennedy would agree to any additional military support required to prevent this outcome. According to Evan Thomas (The Very Best Men): "Some old CIA hands believe that Bissell was setting a trap to force U.S. intervention." Edgar Applewhite, a former deputy inspector general, believed that Bissell and Dulles were "building a tar baby." Jake Esterline was very unhappy with these developments and on 8 April attempted to resign from the CIA. Bissell convinced him to stay.

Invasion fails

The operation tried to rely on Radio Swan, broadcasts being made on a small island 100 miles off the Honduran coast by David Atlee Phillips, calling for the Cuban Army to revolt. They failed to do so.

At 7 a.m. on April 18, Bissell told Kennedy that the invasion force was trapped on the beaches and encircled by Castro’s forces. Then Bissell asked Kennedy to send in American forces to save the men. Bissell expected him to say yes. Instead he replied that he still wanted "minimum visibility." The invasion failed.

That night Bissell had another meeting with John F. Kennedy. This time it took place in the White House and included General Lyman Lemnitzer, the Chairman of the Joint Chiefs of Staff and Admiral Arleigh Burke, Chief of Naval Operations. Bissell told Kennedy that the operation could still be saved if American warplanes were allowed to fly cover. Admiral Burke supported him on this. General Lemnitzer called for the Brigade to join the guerrillas in the Escambray Mountains. Bissell explained this was not an option as their route was being blocked by 20,000 Cuban troops.

As Evan Thomas points out in The Very Best Men, "Bissell had been caught in his own web. 'Plausible deniability' was intended to protect the president, but as he had used it, it was a tool to gain and maintain control over an operation.... Without plausible deniability, the Cuba project would have been turned over to The Pentagon, and Bissell would have become a supporting actor."

Post-CIA
As a face-saving exit from the CIA, John F. Kennedy offered Bissell the post as director of a new science and technology department. This would leave him in charge of the development of the Lockheed A-12, the new spy plane that would make the U-2 obsolete. Bissell turned down the offer and in February 1962 he left the Central Intelligence Agency and was replaced as head of the Directorate for Plans, by Richard Helms.

Bissell became head of the Institute for Defense Analyses (IDA) in 1962. IDA was a Pentagon think tank set up to evaluate weapons systems. Later he worked for United Technologies in Hartford, Connecticut (1964–74), which supplied weapons systems. He also worked as a consultant for the Ford Foundation.

In February 1994, Bissell died at his home in Farmington, Connecticut. His autobiography, Reflections of a Cold Warrior: From Yalta to the Bay of Pigs, was published two years later.

See also

References

Bibliography
Bissell, Richard M. Jr., with Jonathan E. Lewis and Frances T. Pudlo. Reflections of a Cold Warrior: From Yalta to the Bay of Pigs (New Haven and London: Yale University Press, 1996).  
Kornbluh, Peter. 1998. Bay of Pigs Declassified: The Secret CIA Report on the Invasion of Cuba. The New Press. New York. 
Pedlow, Gregory W. and Donald E. Welzenbach. The Central Intelligence Agency and Overhead Reconnaissance: The U-2 and OXCART Programs, 1954–1974. Washington, DC: Central Intelligence Agency, 1992. .
 Online PDF copy
Taubman, Phil. Secret Empire: Eisenhower, the CIA, and the Hidden Story of America’s Space Espionage (New York: Simon & Schuster, 2003).

External links
 Oral History Interview with Richard M. Bissell Jr. – Harry S. Truman Library and Museum – July 9, 1971

1909 births
1994 deaths
American spies
Groton School alumni
People from Hartford, Connecticut
People of the Central Intelligence Agency
People of the Office of Strategic Services
Kennedy administration personnel
Yale College alumni
Yale Graduate School of Arts and Sciences alumni